Duault is a commune in the Côtes-d'Armor department of Brittany in northwestern France.

Population

The inhabitants of Duault are known in French as duaultois.

See also
Communes of the Côtes-d'Armor department

References

External links

 Official website 
 

Communes of Côtes-d'Armor